Turkeycock Mountain is a mountain summit located in Franklin County, Virginia and Henry County, Virginia. A portion of the mountain is protected as the Turkeycock Wildlife Management Area, which is open to the public.

The Samuel Calland (1750-1808) family home had 22 rooms and was situated at the foot of the Turkeycock Mountain. A one-and-a-half-story six-room building with earthen basement is all that remains of the formerly large structure. Several features of the home, including the main room's high ceiling, pine wainscoting, brick chimney, and one staircase, are still visible.

References

Landforms of Franklin County, Virginia
Landforms of Henry County, Virginia
Mountains of Virginia
Mountains under 1000 metres